Neville Cayley may refer to:

 Neville Henry Cayley (1853–1903), Australian bird artist
 Neville William Cayley (1886–1950), son of the above, Australian ornithologist and bird artist